5 ships of the French Navy have borne the name Médée in honour of Medea:

 Médée (1644), a fluyt
 Médée (1704), a 16-gun frigate
 , a 26-gun frigate
 , an  32-gun frigate.
 , a Venetian 64-gun ship of the line taken into French service, also bore the name Médée
 , a 46-gun frigate

References

French Navy ship names